József Ember was a Hungarian football coach who managed the national sides of Ghana and Nigeria during the 1960s. During the 1950s, Ember also helped coach the Chinese national team.

References

Year of birth missing
Year of death missing
Hungarian football managers
Újpest FC managers
Ghana national football team managers
Nigeria national football team managers
Association football coaches
Hungarian expatriate football managers
Hungarian expatriate sportspeople in Ghana
Hungarian expatriate sportspeople in Nigeria
Expatriate football managers in Ghana
Expatriate football managers in Nigeria